José María Carrasco Sanguino (born 16 August 1997) is a Bolivian footballer who plays as a defender for Bolivian Primera División club Blooming and the Bolivia national team.

Club career
Carrasco started his career in Blooming. He made his Primera División debut on 8 May 2016 against Nacional Potosí, coming in as a substitute for Cristian Coimbra in the 66th minute.

In 2022 he was loaned to Universidad de Chile in the Chilean Primera División. After six months, he returned to Blooming.

International career
Carrasco made his debut in Bolivia national under-20 football team on 21 January 2017 in the group stage of 2017 South American U-20 Championship against Peru, playing 79 minutes. He was included in Bolivia's provisional squad for 2019 Copa América released on 15 May 2019. He made his debut on 2 June 2019, in a friendly against France, as an 89th-minute substitute for Adrián Jusino.

References

External links

1997 births
Living people
Sportspeople from Santa Cruz de la Sierra
Bolivian footballers
Bolivia youth international footballers
Bolivia international footballers
Bolivian expatriate footballers
Club Blooming players
C.S.D. Independiente del Valle footballers
Universidad de Chile footballers
Bolivian Primera División players
Ecuadorian Serie A players
Chilean Primera División players
Expatriate footballers in Ecuador
Bolivian expatriate sportspeople in Ecuador
Expatriate footballers in Chile
Bolivian expatriate sportspeople in Chile
Association football defenders